VERY TV is a 24-hour music and entertainment channel owned by VERY ENTERTAINMENT. On air on TrueVisions Channel 64 and 79. The channel originally started its broadcast on May 16, 2011. VERY TV reaches an audience of 8 million viewers in Thailand.

List of programs 
 U Made
 Teen Circle
 On-air Live
 VRZO

References

External links

Television stations in Thailand
Television channels and stations established in 2011
2011 establishments in Thailand